Imam Abd Al-Rahman ibn Ahmad ibn Rajab (736-795 AH/1335–1393 CE), best known as Ibn Rajab Al-Hanbali and also Ibn Rajab, which was a nickname he inherited from his grandfather who was born in the month of Rajab, was a Muslim scholar.

Biography
Imam Ibn Rajab was born in Baghdad in 1335 (736H). His grandfather was a scholar of Islam with a focus in Hadith. His father, also born in Baghdad, studied under a number of scholars. At the age of five Ibn Rajab's family moved to Damascus, then traveled to Jerusalem where he studied under al-Alla'i, then back to Baghdad and from there to Mecca. 
While in Mecca his father arranged for him to study Islam as well. He then traveled to Egypt before returning to Damascus, where he taught students of his own.  Some of the scholars he studied under were Ibn an-Naqeeb (d. 769H), as-Subki, al-Iraqi (d. 806H), and Muhammad Ibn Ismail al-Khabbaz.  He also studied with Ibn Qayyim al-Jawziyyah up to Ibn al-Qayyim's death. Ibn Rajab's commentary on the forty hadith of Nawawi (Jami' al-Ulum wa al-Hikam) is one of the largest and is generally considered the best commentary available. Near the end of his life, Ibn Rajab began composing a commentary on Sahih Bukhari, but unfortunately only reached the chapter on the funeral prayers before he died. He had named his work Fath al-Bari and what he did write has been published by Dar Ibn al-Jawzi in seven volumes. This amounts to less than a sixth of Sahih Bukhari. Twenty years after Ibn Rajab's death, Ibn Hajar al-Asqalani began his commentary on Sahih Bukhari and gave his own work the same title in honour of Ibn Rajab.

Death
Ibn Rajab died on a Monday night 4th of Ramadhan 795AH (1393), at the age of fifty-nine, in a garden area he had rented in Damascus. His funeral prayer was performed the next day and he was buried in the Baab as-Sagheer graveyard.

Comments from other Muslim scholars
Ibn Qadi Shuhbah said of him in his biography: 
"He read and became proficient in the various fields of science. He engrossed himself with the issues of the (Hanbali) maddhab until he mastered it. He devoted himself to the occupation of knowledge of the texts, defects and meanings of the Hadith. And he withdrew himself in seclusion in order to write."

Al-Hafidh ibn Hajr al-Asqalani said of him: 
"He was highly proficient in the scientific disciplines of Hadith in terms of the names of reporters, their biographies, their paths of narration and awareness of their meanings."

Imaam ibn Muflih al-Hanbali said of him: 
"He was the Shaikh, the great scholar, the Hafidh, the one who abstained from the worldly life. He was the Shaikh of the Hanbali maddhab and he wrote many beneficial books."

Works

Tafsir and Qur'anic studies
 Tafsir Surah al-Ikhlaas
 Tafsir Surah al-Faatihah
 Tafsir Surah an-Nasr
 I'raab al-Bismillah
 Al-Istighnaa bil-Qur'an

Hadith studies and explanations
 Sharh Jaami' al-Tirmidhi of which only the last portion of remains – Sharh 'Ilal at-Tirmidhi
 Fath al-Bari bi Sharh Sahih al-Bukhari ( A commentary on Sahih Bukhari )
 Jami' al-'Uloom wal-Hikam fi Sharh khamsina Hadithan min Jawami al-Kalim (published in English translation as The Compendium of Knowledge and Wisdom by Turath Publishing Ltd., London, July 2007)
 Maa Dhi'bani Ja'iaan ursilaa fi Ghanam
 Ikhtiyaar al-Awlaa fi Sharh Hadith Ikhtisaam al-Mala al-A'alaa
 Noor al-Iqtibas fi Mishkaat Wasiyyat an-Nabi Libn Abbas ( Explanation of the advice of the Prophet to Ibn 'Abbas )
 Ghayat an-Nafa fi Sharh Hadith Tamthil al-Mu'min bi Khamat az-Zara
 Kashf al-Kurbah fi Wasfi Hali Ahl al-Ghurbah ( Alleviating Grieviances in Describing the Condition of the Strangers )

Fiqh
 Al-Istikhraj fi Ahkam al-Kharaj
 Al-Qawa'id al-Fiqhiyyah
 Kitab Ahkam al-Khawatim wa ma yat'alaqu biha

Biographical and historical accounts
 Adh-Dhayl 'alaa Tabaqat al-Hanabilah
 Mukhtasar Sirah Umar ibn 'Abd al-'Aziz
 Sirah 'Abd al-Malik ibn Umar ibn 'Abd al-'Aziz

Other
 Lata'if al-Ma'arif fima li Mawasim al-Aam min al-Wadha'if
 At-Takhweef min an-Naar wat-Ta'reef bi Hali Dar al-Bawar
 Al-Farq bayna an-Nasihah wat-Ta'yir ( The difference between advising and condemning )
 Ahwal Ahl al-Quboor
 Fadhl 'Ilm Al-Salaf 'alā'l-Khalaf ( The superiority of the knowledge of the predecessors over the knowledge of the successors )

See also
Ahmad ibn Hanbal
Hanbali Scholars

References

External links 
 Biodata at MuslimScholars.info
 Books by Ibn Rajab
  Ibn Rajab From At-tawhid.net

1335 births
1393 deaths
People from Baghdad
Hanbalis
Sunni Muslim scholars of Islam
Hadith scholars
Atharis
14th-century Muslim scholars of Islam
14th-century jurists